Fior Vásquez (born December 27, 1977) is a female shot putter from the Dominican Republic. Her first name is sometimes also spelled as Flor.

Career
Vásquez is best known for winning the bronze medal at the 2003 Pan American Games in Santo Domingo, where she set a new national record in her sixth and final attempt (18.14 metres). She also represented her native country at the 2004 Summer Olympics in Athens, Greece, finishing in 14th place in the qualifying round of the women's shot put event.

Achievements
All results regarding shot put, unless stated otherwise

References

Profile

1977 births
Living people
Dominican Republic shot putters
Athletes (track and field) at the 2004 Summer Olympics
Athletes (track and field) at the 2003 Pan American Games
Olympic athletes of the Dominican Republic
Female shot putters
Dominican Republic female athletes
Pan American Games medalists in athletics (track and field)
Pan American Games bronze medalists for the Dominican Republic
Central American and Caribbean Games gold medalists for the Dominican Republic
Competitors at the 2002 Central American and Caribbean Games
Central American and Caribbean Games medalists in athletics
Medalists at the 2003 Pan American Games